Admiral Charles Henry Cross (18 May 1852 – 1 January 1915) was a Royal Navy officer. He was Admiral Superintendent, Devonport Dockyard from 1908 to 1910.

References 

1852 births
1915 deaths
Royal Navy admirals
Royal Navy personnel of the Anglo-Egyptian War